Julita Jagodzińska (born 10 February 1997) is a Polish racing cyclist. She rode in the women's sprint event at the 2018 UCI Track Cycling World Championships.

References

1997 births
Living people
Polish female cyclists
Place of birth missing (living people)
Cyclists at the 2019 European Games
European Games competitors for Poland
21st-century Polish women